Elizabeth Marty May (born January 1, 1961) is an American politician and a Republican member of the South Dakota House of Representatives representing District 27 since January 12, 2021. Defeated by Democrat Peri Pourier in 2018, she later ran for another seat and succeeded Oglala Republican Steve Livermont.

Education
May graduated from Spearfish High School.

Elections

2006
When District 27 incumbent Democratic Representative Paul Valandra left the Legislature and left a seat open, May ran as an Independent in the five-way November 7, 2006 General election but lost to incumbent Democratic Representative Jim Bradford and Republican nominee Mark DeVries, who had run for a seat in 2002.

2012
When District 27 incumbent Democratic Representative Edward Iron Cloud left the Legislature and left a seat open, May was unopposed for the June 5, 2012 Republican Primary; in the three-way November 6, 2012 General election incumbent Democratic Representative Kevin Killer took the first seat and May took the second seat with 2,982 votes (36.29%) ahead of Independent candidate Kathleen Ann.

References

External links
Official page at the South Dakota Legislature
 

1961 births
Living people
Schoolteachers from South Dakota
American women educators
Members of the South Dakota House of Representatives
People from Belle Fourche, South Dakota
People from the Pine Ridge Indian Reservation, South Dakota
South Dakota Independents
South Dakota Republicans
Women state legislators in South Dakota
21st-century American politicians
21st-century American women politicians